Radisson Blu Hotel Hamburg is a hotel in Hamburg, Germany operated by Radisson Hotels under the Radisson Blu brand. At 108 meters, it is the tallest hotel in Hamburg and is on the list of tallest buildings in Hamburg and the list of tallest buildings in Germany.

It has 32 floors and 556 rooms. The hotel is in the Planten un Blomen park and is next to the Congress Center Hamburg and near Hamburg Dammtor station. The hotel also has 2,122 m2 of meeting space in 12 conference rooms on a separate floor.

History
The hotel was designed by architects Jost Schramm and Gert Pempelfort. Construction began in 1970 and the hotel opened in April 1973 as Loews Hamburg Plaza. It was renamed Hamburg Plaza Hotel when it was managed by Canadian Pacific Hotels.

In 1988, it was acquired by SAS Group and renamed the SAS Hamburg Plaza Hotel. When SAS Group's SAS International Hotels created a co-brand with Radisson Hotels, it was renamed Radisson SAS Hamburg Hotel.

In October 2009, a €48 million renovation of the hotel was completed.

In November 2009, a European hotel fund managed by Invesco acquired the hotel for €155 million. The hotel was renamed the Radisson Blu Hotel Hamburg in 2009.

In November 2015, Azure acquired the hotel.

In March 2017, Wenaasgruppen acquired the hotel.

In popular culture
The final episodes of the ZDF television series Timm Thaler were filmed at the hotel.

See also
 List of hotels in Germany

References

External links

 
  
  
 

Radisson Blu
Buildings and structures in Hamburg-Mitte
Skyscrapers in Hamburg
1973 establishments in Germany
Hotels established in 1973
Hotel buildings completed in 1973
Skyscraper hotels in Germany